The Institutes of Biblical Law is a 1973 book by the philosopher and theologian Rousas John Rushdoony. It is the first volume of a three-volume work, also referred to by the same title, which is modeled after John Calvin's Institutes of the Christian Religion (1536). Together with Rushdoony's other writings, the book is the basis of Christian reconstructionism.

Summary

Rushdoony expounds the Ten Commandments, adopting a theonomic perspective. He maintains that almost all of the Old Testament civil law is normative for civil governments. Rushdoony provides an outline of a program for establishing a Christian theocracy.

Reception
Christianity Today listed The Institutes of Biblical Law among its "Significant Books for 1973", calling it "the most impressive theological work of 1973", and "a monumental work that should give invaluable help for constructive thinking and practical conduct".

The theologian John Frame gave The Institutes of Biblical Law a mixed review in Westminster Theological Journal, writing that the book convinced him that "Rushdoony is one of the most important Christian social critics alive today", but also criticizing it on various grounds. Frame credited Rushdoony with cogently arguing against attempts to replace scripture with natural law, with showing a broad and deep knowledge of scripture, and with "a remarkably detailed grasp of the historical background and present condition of human culture." However, he found the book "a bit rough-hewn", noting that it "began as a series of lectures" and in some respects still resembles one, and that it contained "considerable repetition". Overall, Frame concluded that the book had "great strengths and great weaknesses", noting that he had tried "to keep this review balanced between strong praise and strong criticism."

The journalist M. Stanton Evans described The Institutes of Biblical Law as "a work of prodigious scope and erudition" and a "thoughtful book" in National Review. Joe Bageant suggests that if the United States experiences a fourth "Great Awakening", historians may one day "document it as beginning in 1973 with the publication of R. J. Rushdoony's seminal The Institutes of Biblical Law." Peter Montgomery of the Public Eye Magazine describes The Institutes of Biblical Law as Rushdoony's "magnum opus", and identifies it and Rushdoony's other writings as providing the basis for Christian reconstructionism.

References

External links
Excerpts compiled by Richard Anthony

1973 non-fiction books
Christian reconstructionism
Christian theology books
English-language books